Dallas shooting or Dallas police shooting may refer to:

 Assassination of John F. Kennedy, U.S. President, on November 22, 1963
 2001 Dallas shootings, in which two people were killed
 2015 attack on Dallas police, in which officers were not harmed
 2016 shooting of Dallas police officers, in which five officers were killed and eleven other people wounded
 Murder of Botham Jean, in which a Black man was fatally shot by police
 2019 Dallas courthouse shooting, in which the gunman was killed and a civilian slightly wounded while taking cover
 Methodist Dallas Medical Center shooting, in which two hospital employees were killed

See also
 List of shootings in Texas